The Canadian province of Quebec held municipal elections in its municipalities on November 5, 2017.

Results by region:

Note: (X) refers to being an incumbent

Bas-Saint-Laurent

Amqui

La Pocatière

Matane

Mont-Joli

Rimouski

Mayor

Rimouski City Council

Rivière-du-Loup

Saint-Épiphane

Trois-Pistoles

Saguenay–Lac-Saint-Jean

Alma

Dolbeau-Mistassini

Roberval

Saguenay

Mayor

Saguenay City Council

By-election
A by-election was held in District #1 on December 15, 2019. The results were as follows:

Saint-Félicien

Saint-Honoré

Capitale-Nationale

Baie-Saint-Paul

Boischatel

Donnacona

La Malbaie

L'Ancienne-Lorette

By-election
A mayoral by-election was held December 13, 2020 to replace Loranger.

Lac-Beauport

Les Éboulements
The mayoral campaign in Les Éboulements was noted for the unusual fact that both candidates had the same name, Pierre Tremblay. One was the incumbent mayor of the town, and the other was an incumbent town councillor. The two Pierre Tremblays, who are not related, agreed to include their home addresses in their campaign materials and on the ballot so that voters could distinguish them. The incumbent mayor won re-election.

Pont-Rouge

Portneuf

Quebec City

Mayor

Quebec City Council

By-election
A by-election was held in the Neufchâtel-Lebourgneuf District on December 9, 2018. The results were as follows:

Saint-Augustin-de-Desmaures

Sainte-Brigitte-de-Laval

Sainte-Catherine-de-la-Jacques-Cartier

Saint-Raymond

Shannon

Stoneham-et-Tewkesbury

Mauricie

La Tuque

Louiseville

Notre-Dame-du-Mont-Carmel

Shawinigan

Mayor

Shawinigan City Council

Trois-Rivières

Mayor

By-election
A mayoral by-election was held May 5, 2019 to replace Lévesque.

Trois-Rivières City Council

Estrie

Asbestos

Coaticook

Cookshire-Eaton

Lac-Mégantic

Magog

Sherbrooke

Mayor

Sherbrooke City Council

Windsor

Montréal

Baie-D'Urfé

Beaconsfield

Côte-Saint-Luc

Dollard-des-Ormeaux

Mayor

Dollard-des-Ormeaux City Council

Dorval

Hampstead

Kirkland

L'Île-Dorval

Montreal

Montréal-Est

Montreal West

Mount Royal

Pointe-Claire

Sainte-Anne-de-Bellevue

Senneville

Westmount

Outaouais

Cantley

Chelsea

Gatineau

Gracefield

L'Ange-Gardien

La Pêche

Papineauville

Pontiac

Val-des-Monts

Abitibi-Témiscamingue

Amos

La Sarre

Rouyn-Noranda

Mayor

Rouyn-Noranda City Council

Val-d'Or

Côte-Nord

Baie-Comeau

Fermont

Havre-Saint-Pierre

L'Île-d'Anticosti

Port-Cartier

Sept-Îles

Tadoussac

Nord-du-Québec

Chapais

Chibougamau

Lebel-sur-Quévillon

Matagami

Gaspésie–Îles-de-la-Madeleine

Bonaventure

Cap-Chat

Caplan

Carleton-sur-Mer

Cascapédia–Saint-Jules

Chandler

Cloridorme

Escuminac

Gaspé

Grande-Rivière

Grande-Vallée

Grosse-Île

Hope

Hope Town

La Martre

L'Ascension-de-Patapédia

Les Îles-de-la-Madeleine

Maria

Marsoui

Matapédia

Mont-Saint-Pierre

Murdochville

New Carlisle

New Richmond

Nouvelle

Paspébiac

Percé

Petite-Vallée

Pointe-à-la-Croix

Port-Daniel–Gascons

Ristigouche-Partie-Sud-Est

Rivière-à-Claude

Saint-Alexis-de-Matapédia

Saint-Alphonse

Saint-André-de-Restigouche

Sainte-Anne-des-Monts

Saint-Elzéar

Sainte-Madeleine-de-la-Rivière-Madeleine

Sainte-Thérèse-de-Gaspé

Saint-François-d'Assise

Saint-Godefroi

Saint-Maxime-du-Mont-Louis

Saint-Siméon

Shigawake

Chaudière-Appalaches

Beauceville

Lévis

Mayor

Lévis City Council

Montmagny

Saint-Apollinaire

Sainte-Marie

Saint-Georges

Saint-Henri

Saint-Lambert-de-Lauzon

Thetford Mines

Laval

Mayor

Laval City Council

By-election
A by-election was held in the Marc-Aurèle-Fortin District District on November 24, 2019. The results were as follows:

Lanaudière

Charlemagne

Joliette

L'Assomption

Lavaltrie

Mascouche

Mayor

Mascouche City Council

Notre-Dame-des-Prairies

Rawdon

Repentigny

Mayor

Repentigny City Council

Saint-Calixte

Saint-Charles-Borromée

Sainte-Julienne

Saint-Félix-de-Valois

Saint-Lin-Laurentides

Saint-Paul

Saint-Roch-de-l'Achigan

Terrebonne

Mayor

Terrebonne City Council

* The initial count was tied; after a re-count, Lepage was declared the winner by one vote.

Laurentides

Blainville

Mayor

Blainville City Council

Boisbriand

Bois-des-Filion

Brownsburg-Chatham

Deux-Montagnes

Lachute

Lorraine

Mirabel

Mayor

Mirabel City Council

Mont-Laurier

Mont-Tremblant

Pointe-Calumet

Prévost

Rosemère

Saint-Colomban

Sainte-Adèle

Sainte-Agathe-des-Monts

Sainte-Anne-des-Plaines

Sainte-Marthe-sur-le-Lac

Sainte-Sophie

Sainte-Thérèse

Saint-Eustache

Mayor

Saint-Eustache City Council

Saint-Hippolyte

Saint-Jérôme

Mayor

Saint-Jérôme City Council

Saint-Joseph-du-Lac

Saint-Sauveur

Montérégie

Acton Vale

Beauharnois

Beloeil

Boucherville

Mayor

Boucherville City Council

Bromont

Brossard

Mayor

Brossard City Council

Candiac

Carignan

Chambly

By-election
A by-election was held June 23, 2019 for mayor:

Châteauguay

Mayor

Châteauguay City Council

Contrecoeur

Coteau-du-Lac

Cowansville

Delson

East Farnham

Farnham

Granby

Mayor

Granby City Council

Hudson

Lac-Brome

La Prairie

Les Cèdres

Les Coteaux

L'Île-Perrot

Longueuil

Mayor

Longueuil City Council

Marieville

McMasterville

Mercier

Mont-Saint-Hilaire

Notre-Dame-de-l'Île-Perrot

Otterburn Park

Pincourt

Richelieu

Rigaud

Saint-Amable

Saint-Basile-le-Grand

Saint-Bruno-de-Montarville

Saint-Césaire

Saint-Constant

Sainte-Catherine

Sainte-Julie

Sainte-Martine

Saint-Hyacinthe

Mayor

Saint-Hyacinthe City Council

Saint-Jean-sur-Richelieu

Mayor

Saint-Jean-sur-Richelieu City Council

Saint-Lambert

Saint-Lazare

Saint-Philippe

Saint-Pie

Saint-Rémi

Saint-Zotique

Salaberry-de-Valleyfield

Mayor

Salaberry-de-Valleyfield City Council

Shefford

Sorel-Tracy

Varennes

Vaudreuil-Dorion

Mayor

Vaudreuil-Dorion City Council

Verchères

Centre-du-Québec

Bécancour

Drummondville

Mayor

By-election
A mayoral by-election was intended to be held October 4, 2020 to replace Cusson. However, only one candidate, Alain Carrier entered the race, and was therefore acclaimed.

Drummondville City Council

By-election
A by-election was held on June 16, 2019 in District 4:

Nicolet

Plessisville

Princeville

Victoriaville

Mayor

Victoriaville City Council

Prefectural elections

Kamouraska

La Haute-Gaspésie

La Matapédia

La Vallée-de-la-Gatineau

Le Granit

Le Haut-Saint-François

Le Rocher-Percé

Les Basques

Les Pays-d'en-Haut

Manicouagan

Maria-Chapdelaine

Minganie

Montcalm

Pontiac

Témiscamingue

Témiscouata

See also
Municipal elections in Canada
Electronic voting in Canada
2005 Quebec municipal elections
2006 Quebec municipal elections
2009 Quebec municipal elections
2013 Quebec municipal elections

References

External links
Results

 
Municipal elections in Quebec
November 2017 events in Canada